Barbara Allan Simpson (born July 29, 1937) is an American retired TV reporter, news anchor, and conservative radio talk show host. She is currently an on-line columnist.

Early life and education
Simpson was born Barbara Allan in New York City and raised in Ocean County, New Jersey. Her parents were Rose (née Colletta), of Italian descent, and John Allan (surname anglicized), a Croatian immigrant. She has a brother, Henry Allan. 

She graduated from Georgian Court College with a Bachelor of Science degree in 1958 and later earned a Master of Arts degree from Michigan State University.

Career

Academic
Simpson was an assistant professor and chair of the textiles and clothing department at Mount St. Mary's College in Los Angeles and was on the faculty of a similar department at Michigan State University.

TV, radio, and columnist
Barbara Simpson was a prominent television news anchor at KTVU, Channel 2, in Oakland, KQED, Channel 9, and KOFY-TV Channel 20 (both in San Francisco), and later in Los Angeles, from the late 1970s through the 1990s.

She was the Public Relations Director for The Cousteau Society, where she worked with Captain Jacques Cousteau, coordinating media and the worldwide petition campaign.

Simpson was notably the host of Coast to Coast AM on Saturday nights from 2000 to 2003, alternating with George Noory. She occasionally hosted on other nights as well, including substituting for the show's founder, Art Bell.

She was a long-time host of her own radio talk show on San Francisco station KSFO (AM). Until May 3, 2014, when her show was abruptly canceled, Simpson was on Saturday and Sunday afternoons, with frequent weekday fill-in appearances as host for other shows on the station.

Simpson is known for her conservative political views. , she writes a commentary column titled The Babe In The Bunker — referring to her status as a conservative in the famously liberal San Francisco Bay Area — for the conservative online news site WorldNetDaily.

Personal
Simpson is an experienced markswoman. A Roman Catholic, she lives in Moraga, California. She has two daughters, Elizabeth Zubkoff and Patricia Simpson.

Honors
2007 Golden Microphone-Excellence in Broadcasting Award
Eagle Forum of California
The "Golden Medallion", from the California State Bar, for TV reports
TV Woman of the Year, NoCa, American Women in Radio and Television
Kudo Award for her KSFO program
National Commission on Working Women, Peninsula Press Club, Oakland Business and Professional Women * B'nai B'rith Anti-Defamation League.

References

External links
KSFO Bio

1937 births
Living people
American people of Croatian descent
American people of Italian descent
American columnists
Television anchors from Los Angeles
Television anchors from San Francisco
American political commentators
Coast to Coast AM
Georgian Court University alumni
Michigan State University alumni
Michigan State University faculty
People from Moraga, California
Mount St. Mary's University faculty
Radio personalities from San Francisco
Catholics from California